Four ships of the United States Navy have been named USS Reid, after  Sailing Master Samuel Chester Reid.

 The first  was a destroyer in service from 1909 to 1919.
 The second  was a destroyer in service from 1919 to 1930.
 The third  was a destroyer launched in 1936 and sunk by kamikazes in the Philippines in 1944.
 The fourth  was a guided-missile frigate commissioned 1983 and transferred to Turkey in 1999.

See also
 

United States Navy ship names